Gaya Airport  is an international airport serving Gaya, Bihar, India.

Overview

The airport is spread over an area of 954 acres. The airport terminal building, spread over 7,500 square meters can handle 250 departure and 250 arrival passengers, two aerobridges and an apron capable for handling five Airbus A320 type aircraft. It is mainly seasonal and primarily caters to Buddhist tourists coming from South-East Asian countries from Thailand, Bhutan and  Myanmar at present.

A January 2021 report by the Parliament of India described the IATA code as "inappropriate, unsuitable, offensive and embarrassing" for Gaya due to the city's religious significance. In its report, the Committee on Public Undertakings recommended changing the airport code from "GAY" to "YAG", asking the government to "make all efforts" to change the code. As of February 2022, IATA has rejected a code change, stating that airport codes are permanent unless a strong justification relating to air safety is given. LGBT groups in India have criticized the parliamentary committee's request as reflective of homophobia.

Expansion 
An additional 100 acres of land is under process for acquiring, while another 100 acres of land from four villages is to be acquired for runway expansion. The Airports Authority of India (AAI) plans to develop the airport as a standby to Kolkata Airport. The then Minister of State for Civil Aviation, K.C. Venugopal, informed the Rajya Sabha on 2018  that AAI has requested the Government of Bihar for a further acquisition of around 200 acres to allow the airport to be expanded. The airport is to be expanded and upgraded with the construction of a new passenger terminal building which would replace the current terminal structure. Other expansion works include expanding runaway 10/28, and installation of CAT-I ILS approach system. In the future, a cargo terminal has also been planned to be built.

Airlines and destinations

Statistics 

Passenger, and Aircraft Movement at Gaya Airport (2011-2022)

See also
 Patna Airport
 Darbhanga Airport
 Bihta Airport
 Bihta Air Force Station
 List of airports in India
 List of the busiest airports in India

References

External links 
Gaya Airport - India Airport Global Website
Airport Authority of India, Gaya Airport
Gaya Airport Information

Airports in Bihar
Airfields of the United States Army Air Forces Air Transport Command in the China-Burma-India Theater
Airfields of the United States Army Air Forces in British India
Transport in Gaya, India
1936 establishments in India
Airports established in 1936
International airports in India
20th-century architecture in India